Carousel is a 1956 American drama fantasy musical film based on the 1945 Rodgers and Hammerstein stage musical of the same name, which in turn was based on Ferenc Molnár's 1909 non-musical play Liliom. The film stars Gordon MacRae and Shirley Jones, and was directed by Henry King. Like the original stage production, the film contains what many critics consider some of Rodgers and Hammerstein's most beautiful songs, as well as what may be, along with the plots of Allegro, South Pacific, and The King and I, the most serious storyline found in their musicals.

Plot

The story revolves around Billy Bigelow, a rough-talking, macho, handsome carousel barker, and Julie Jordan, a young, innocent mill worker, both living their busy lives in the small town of Boothbay Harbor, Maine. They fall in love, but are fired from their jobs for different reasons: Billy, because he paid too much attention to Julie and incurred the wrath of the jealous carousel owner Mrs. Mullin; and Julie, because she stayed out past the curfew imposed by the understanding but stern mill owner, Mr. Bascombe.

Billy and Julie marry and go to live at the seaside spa of her cousin Nettie. Julie admits that Billy, frustrated and bitter because he can't find work, has started hitting her. Mrs. Mullin hears of this and goes to Nettie's to offer Billy his job back, but will not re-hire him unless he leaves his wife. Billy seems to consider the idea when Julie asks to speak with him privately. Fearing he will be enraged, Julie timidly tells him she is pregnant. But Billy is overjoyed and firmly refuses Mrs. Mullin's offer. However, newly worried about not having enough money to provide for his child, and inexperienced at anything else, Billy secretly agrees to join his pal Jigger Craigin in robbing the wealthy Bascombe.

During a clambake on a nearby island, Billy and Jigger sneak onto the mainland to commit the robbery, but Bascombe, who is usually unarmed, carries a gun and the robbery is foiled. While Bascombe is momentarily distracted, Jigger flees and leaves Billy at the mercy of the police. Cornered, Billy climbs atop a pile of crates, but they collapse and Billy falls on his own knife. The others return from the clambake, and Julie sees the mortally wounded Billy. She rushes to him and he dies after saying his last words to her. Julie is devastated because she truly loved him, even though she never had the courage to say it out loud.

Fifteen years later, in the other world (apparently the back door of Heaven), Billy is told that he can return to Earth for one day to make amends. Billy returns to find his daughter Louise emotionally scarred because she is constantly taunted over the fact that her father tried to commit a robbery. Not telling her who he is, Billy makes himself visible, tries to cheer her up, and gives her a star that he stole from Heaven. Louise refuses it, frightened, and Billy, in desperation, slaps her hand. She rushes inside the house and informs Julie of what happened, saying that she did not feel a slap, but a kiss. Billy tries to make himself invisible before Julie can see him, but she has glimpsed him for just a split second, and senses that he has come back for a reason. Billy asks his Heavenly Guide for permission to go to Louise's high school graduation, and there he silently gives both Louise and Julie the confidence they need and the knowledge that, in spite of everything, he did love Julie.

Cast
 Gordon MacRae as Billy Bigelow
 Shirley Jones as Julie Jordan
 Cameron Mitchell as Jigger Craigin
 Barbara Ruick as Carrie Pipperidge
 Claramae Turner as Cousin Nettie Fowler
 Gene Lockhart as the Starkeeper and Dr. Seldon
 Audrey Christie as Mrs. Mullin
 Robert Rounseville as Enoch Snow
 John Dehner as Mr. Bascombe
 Susan Luckey as Louise Bigelow
 Jacques d'Amboise as the Starlight Carnival barker
 William LeMassena as the Heavenly Friend
 Tor Johnson as Strong Man (uncredited)

Film size
The film was made in CinemaScope 55, and DeLuxe Color. It was, however, ultimately shown in regular 35 mm CinemaScope rather than the 55mm version of the process, although the original premiere did feature a six-track magnetic stereo soundtrack specially devised for CinemaScope 55. It was played on a separate machine synchronized with the picture. All of the other prints of the film were composite prints, and used the standard 4-track stereo soundtrack featured on regular CinemaScope films circa 1953–1957.

Differences from musical
The film followed the stage musical faithfully, except for five major changes:

In the film, Billy dies by accident, rather than by suicide as in the show – when he falls on his own knife while trying to escape arrest. In the original stage production, he deliberately stabs himself while standing on the pile of crates, which does not collapse.
The 'recitative' singing in the 'bench scene', leading directly into the song "If I Loved You", is turned into spoken dialogue.
The 'recitative' singing that leads directly into the song "June Is Bustin' Out All Over" is eliminated.
The film begins in 1888, with Billy having been dead for fifteen years, and the story of his life on Earth (from his first meeting with Julie at the carousel, to his death) is made into a flashback that takes up three-quarters of the film. Billy tells his own story to the Starkeeper, in order to receive permission to return to Earth for one day, which he was offered when he first arrived but turned down. This last change was made to safeguard against the movie audience's being surprised at the death of Billy, and to prevent them from leaving the movie theatre directly after it happens, in case they thought the story ended at that point.
In the film, there is no specific mention of the fact that Billy must return to Earth for one day and perform a good deed, in order to win entry into Heaven, as there is in the play. In the film's opening scene (a pre-credits sequence), a Heavenly Friend advises Billy that 'there's trouble ... down on Earth', in case he should like to return there. Billy takes the friend up on the offer, but the film gives the impression that he is not doing it specifically to be admitted into Heaven.

A smaller, less important change was the switching of the song "When The Children Are Asleep" to a later moment, in order to take full advantage of the Maine locale. In the film, it is sung in a new scene by Carrie and Mr. Snow (in their boat) as the couple, together with Julie and Billy, sail to the island for the clambake. (This would logically place the song between Acts I and II of the stage version.) In the original stage production, the song is unheard by any of the other characters, but the film places it so that Julie and Billy are there to listen to the song, and to lend a sharp contrast to the happiness that Mr. Snow feels in comparison to Billy's obvious uneasiness about the robbery that he and Jigger are soon to commit.

Other minor changes include a scene bridging the duet between Julie and Billy singing "If I Loved You" and the ensemble number "June is Bustin' Out All Over", in which Cousin Nettie is first introduced, arguing with a local fisherman who is gossiping about where Julie has disappeared to with Billy after losing their jobs. Immediately afterwards, Julie appears with a sullen Billy whom she introduces to Nettie as her new husband, and Nettie welcomes him into the family despite her obvious reservations. This is followed by a dialogue in Heaven between Billy and the Starkeeper, during which Billy admits he did not so much mind sponging off of Nettie as he did mind having nothing to do.

Another minor (albeit interesting) change was an additional bit of dialogue concerning the fate of Jigger, which was not revealed in the original musical. The Starkeeper informs Billy that Jigger has died, and although he refuses to say anything further than that, it is implied that Jigger's soul ended up in Hell.

Original casting 
Frank Sinatra was originally cast to play Billy Bigelow. He even pre-recorded the songs he was to sing in the film. Prior to filming, the cast knew they had to film some scenes twice, one for regular Cinemascope and the other for CinemaScope 55. According to one account, when Sinatra arrived on the set, he claimed that he was being paid to film one movie, not two, and he walked away from the set and said: "You're not getting two Sinatras for the price of one". However, according to Shirley Jones' 2014 autobiography, the real reason he walked away from the film was that the love of his life, Ava Gardner, told him that if he didn't accompany her on her film set immediately, she would start an affair with her costar. Gardner was in the late stages of filming The Barefoot Contessa at the time. After Sinatra left the production, the filmmakers found a way to film the scene once on 55 mm, then transfer it onto 35 mm; thus, the film did not have to be shot twice.

On February 14, 1958, Shirley Jones guested on the Frank Sinatra Show and performed  "If I Loved You" with him. This taste of what could have been if Sinatra had not quit the film can be seen on the DVD Sinatra – The Classic Duets. The songs that Sinatra recorded for the original soundtrack were never released to the general public due to contractual issues. "Soliloquy", the song that the character Billy Bigelow sings when he learns that his wife is expecting a child, was one of Sinatra's favorites. He recorded it in the 1940s for Columbia, for Capitol in the 1950s, and again in the 1960s for Reprise.

At one point, Judy Garland was announced to star in the film opposite Sinatra before Jones was brought on board in her place.

Reception
The world premiere of the film, held in New York, was attended by Washington diplomats as well as film stars. Among those in the audience were Averell Harriman and Edmund Muskie. Muskie was at that time the governor of Maine, where the story is set and where a large part of the movie was filmed.  Locations for the film include:
Boothbay Harbor, Maine (scenes outside Nettie's Spa including the musical numbers "June is Bustin' Out All Over", sung and danced directly outside the spa,  and "When The Children Are Asleep", sung in a moving sailboat on the way to the clambake; Billy and Jigger's discussion of the robbery, the robbery sequence — including the card game — and Billy's death scene)
Camden, Maine (the confrontation between Julie, Mrs. Mullin, Carrie, and Billy outside the amusement park)
Newcastle and Augusta, Maine
Paradise Cove, California (where Billy sings his "Soliloquy" and where some of "Louise's Ballet" is danced), and
The soundstages of Twentieth Century Fox studios. In Boothbay Harbor, many of the scenes were filmed where the Carousel Marina now exists.

The film received mostly good reviews, but sources differ as to its financial success.  Musical theatre scholar Thomas Hischak stated that the film "was a box office success across the country and 20th Century-Fox earned a considerable profit on the picture". However, the review at allmovie.com states: "The film's often downbeat tone ... did not resonate with 1950s audiences, making Carousel a surprising box-office flop. Some reviewers were also critical of the acceptance of wife beating in the film." Another analysis states that "The American release of Carousel actually lost money for Twentieth Century Fox, but Kine Weekly claimed that it was generally successful at the British box office."

The soundtrack album sold well, and the film's exposure on television, VHS and DVD has won a larger audience for it. It was one of only three Rodgers and Hammerstein films (out of nine) that were not nominated for any Academy Awards. (The 1962 State Fair, an unsuccessful remake of R&H's hit musical written especially for film, and an unsuccessful animated remake of The King and I (1999) received no nominations either. Unlike Carousel, however, they were almost universally reviled by critics.)  However, some of the technical staff of Carousel also worked on the first film version of The King and I, also released in 1956,  and they did receive Academy Awards for that film, so they did not go home empty-handed on Oscar Night 1957. ‘’Carousel’’ received its home video debut in September 1990 and again in 1994 and 1999. The DVD edition debuted in 1999 and again in November 2006 for its 50th Anniversary, concurrent with the 50th Anniversary release of ‘’The King and I’’ as well as ‘’South Pacific’’. All three films were released as a 2-disc special edition full of bonus material, including audio commentary.

Carousel was named #41 on Channel 4's (London) list of 100 Greatest Musicals.

Also, the film is recognized by American Film Institute in these lists:
 2002: AFI's 100 Years...100 Passions – Nominated
 2004: AFI's 100 Years...100 Songs:
 "If I Loved You" – Nominated
 "June Is Bustin' Out All Over" – Nominated
 "You'll Never Walk Alone" – Nominated
 2006: AFI's 100 Years...100 Cheers – Nominated
 2006: AFI's Greatest Movie Musicals – Nominated

Soundtrack album
The soundtrack album was first issued on vinyl LP in 1956 by Capitol Records, but only in mono. However, because the film's soundtrack had been recorded in then state-of-the-art stereo, as all Cinemascope films were back then, it was possible for Capitol to release a stereo version of the album in 1958, after stereo records became a reality. The later release was shortened by about five minutes, by abridging the opening instrumental "Carousel Waltz" due to technical limitations imposed by the then-new format. The mono release, as originally issued, played for about 50 minutes, while the stereo one played for 45.

A large team of orchestrators lent their expertise to the complex musical arrangements recorded for the soundtrack: Nelson Riddle, Herbert W. Spencer, Earle Hagen, Edward B. Powell (responsible for "If I Loved You"), Bernard Mayer and Gus Levene.

Three editions of the soundtrack album were issued on compact disc, all in stereo. The first, issued in 1986 by Capitol, was an exact duplicate of the 1958 stereo release. The rights then were obtained by Angel Records, who issued a second edition of the album, this time featuring the complete "Carousel Waltz" in stereo for the first time, along with all of the other songs included on the previous CD and vinyl incarnations. This album was superseded in 2001 by Angel's 'expanded edition' of the soundtrack, which, for the first time, featured practically all of the songs and music recorded for the film, including the dance music, resulting in a playing time of 70 minutes, as opposed to the original 45-minute stereo vinyl and CD pressings.

Under the vocal direction of Ken Darby, the songs and performers on the expanded edition of the album are:

 Introduction – Gordon MacRae/William Le Massena  (this is the opening pre-credits sequence, consisting of spoken dialogue)
 Main Title: The Carousel Waltz – 20th Century-Fox Orchestra/Alfred Newman  (about five minutes after the Main Title ends, a slightly longer version of the "Carousel Waltz" is heard - this time during the scene showing Julie and Billy's first meeting in the amusement park; but possibly to avoid repetition, this second playing of the waltz was not included in the soundtrack album. However, "Carousel Waltz" is heard again in the track "Louise's Ballet")
 You're A Queer One, Julie Jordan – Barbara Ruick/Shirley Jones
 (When I Marry) Mr. Snow – Barbara Ruick
 If I Loved You – Shirley Jones/Gordon MacRae
 June Is Bustin' Out All Over – Claramae Turner/Barbara Ruick and Chorus (leads without a pause into)
 June Is Bustin' Out All Over Ballet – 20th Century-Fox Orchestra/Newman
 Soliloquy – Gordon MacRae
 Blow High, Blow Low – Cameron Mitchell and Men's Chorus
 When The Children Are Asleep – Robert Rounseville/Barbara Ruick
 A Real Nice Clambake – Barbara Ruick/Claramae Turner/Robert Rounseville/Cameron Mitchell and Chorus
 Stonecutters Cut It On Stone – Cameron Mitchell and Chorus
 What's The Use Of Wond'rin – Shirley Jones and Women's Chorus
 You'll Never Walk Alone – Shirley Jones/Claramae Turner
 Louise's Ballet – Orchestra/Newman
 If I Loved You (reprise) – Gordon MacRae
 You'll Never Walk Alone (Finale) – Shirley Jones and Chorus
 Carousel Waltz (album version) – Orchestra/Newman (an additional track that contains the full eight-minute "Carousel Waltz").

Chart positions
The LP first charted in the singles chart in June 1956 as the first album chart was not published until a few weeks later (week ending 28 July 1956), with the Carousel film soundtrack becoming the second number one in the UK albums after two weeks of Frank Sinatra.

Deleted and cut songs

Two songs recorded for the film, "You're a Queer One, Julie Jordan" (sung by Ruick and Jones) and "Blow High, Blow Low" (sung by Mitchell and a male chorus) were eventually left out of the movie because the producers wanted to keep the length at 128 minutes. However, they have been included in all editions of the soundtrack album. "The Highest Judge of All", a song which precedes Billy's meeting with the Starkeeper in the show, and in which he asks to meet God, was eliminated from the film score and does not appear on the soundtrack album, presumably because the flashback scenes precluded it. Mr. Snow's sentimental song, "Geraniums in the Winder", which serves as an introduction to "Stonecutters Cut It on Stone", was also eliminated, as was a reprise of "Mister Snow". As with "The Highest Judge", neither "Geraniums in the Winder" nor the reprise of "Mister Snow" were ever recorded for the film, and have not appeared on any editions of the film's soundtrack. One verse of "Stonecutters Cut It on Stone" (which appears on the album) was omitted from the film, perhaps because it contains a veiled reference to sex, and the movie censors of the day might have objected.

The soundtrack album also featured (as noted above) the complete version of "Carousel Waltz", which is first heard at the beginning of the original stage musical and early in the film. Because of its nearly eight-minute length, only an abridged version of the waltz was actually heard in the movie, and many stage productions of Carousel tend to shorten the piece as well, because of time considerations. In addition, the soundtrack album version of the song "When the Children Are Asleep" includes the long introductory section to the song sung by Mr. Snow, as it is in the stage musical; the film does not use this. The soundtrack album also includes a section of "If I Loved You" that is not in the film. The lyric of this section, which is supposed to be sung by Billy Bigelow, is as follows:

 Kind of scrawny and pale
 Pickin' at my food
 And lovesick like any other guy.
 I'd throw away my sweater
 And dress up like a dude
 In a dickey and collar and a tie,
 If I loved you.

This section leads to Billy reprising the refrain of the song. In the film, the refrain is still there, but the lines quoted above are omitted. Billy simply says 'I wonder what it'd be like', upon which Julie responds knowingly, 'If you loved me? But you don't.' In turn, Billy answers, 'No I don't', and goes on to sing the refrain of the song beginning with the lines

 But somehow I can see
 Just exactly how I'd be.

First telecast
The film was first telecast on The ABC Sunday Night Movie, on the evening of March 13, 1966, pan and scanned in a slightly edited version which ran between 9:00 and 11:30 P.M, E.S.T. It was repeated only three months later, on the evening of June 26, 1966. After these two network telecasts, the film was sold to local stations. It now occasionally turns up on cable and was finally shown on Turner Classic Movies for the first time on April 18, 2013, in letterbox format and anamorphically enhanced in its proper aspect ratio for hi-def television sets.

Remake
Another film version of Carousel has been in pre-production for several years; produced by Hugh Jackman, who would star as Billy Bigelow. Like the original, this remake would be distributed by 20th Century Fox.  As of May 2009, the script was reportedly finished. Jackman mentioned that he would like to see Anne Hathaway considered for Julie Jordan. Jackman maintained that the project is still a no-go "but I think there's more momentum for it. I'm keeping my fingers crossed that the film can still happen before I'm too old to play it (Bigelow)."

See also
List of American films of 1956
 List of films about angels

References

External links
 
 
 
 

1956 films
1950s musical fantasy films
Films based on musicals
American musical fantasy films
Films based on works by Ferenc Molnár
Musicals by Rodgers and Hammerstein
20th Century Fox films
Films set in Maine
Films shot in Maine
Films directed by Henry King
Films scored by Alfred Newman
Films scored by Ken Darby
Films about the afterlife
Films based on adaptations
CinemaScope films
1950s English-language films
1950s American films

ja:回転木馬 (ミュージカル)#映画